Bouligneux is a commune in the Ain department in eastern France, in Dombes, within the Auvergne-Rhône-Alpes region.

Geography
The Chalaronne forms most of the commune's eastern border.

History
Bouligneux first appears as vicus Beliniacum in 885, in a document of Charles III.

On March 28, 944, Hugues, son or Bermund, lord of Bouligneux and Gisèle, signed a document renouncing any claims on Thoissey, in favor of  Adémar, Viscount of Lyon.

In 1280, it belonged to Vaucher de Commarin, who sold it to Henri de Villars in 1290.

In 1402, Bouligneux was part of Bresse Savoyarde.

In the 17th century, Bouligneux was a county.

Population

See also
Communes of the Ain department
Dombes

References

External links

La Dombes and the city of Bouligneux

Communes of Ain
Ain communes articles needing translation from French Wikipedia